Scattergood Baines is a 1941 American comedy-drama film.  It is based on a novel by Clarence Budington Kelland. The character of Scattergood was also popular during the days of live radio.

In the film, Guy Kibbee plays the title character.  The plot has him choosing the small New England town of Cold River to settle down in and, twenty years later, his outmaneuvering of the townspeople both when it comes to large matters (ownership of the local railroad) and small (the pretty new schoolteacher's hair).

Five other Scattergood Baines films, all starring Guy Kibbee, were subsequently made.

Cast 

 Guy Kibbee as Scattergood Baines
 Carol Hughes as Helen Parker
 John Archer as Johnny Bones
 Dink Trout as Pliny Pickett
 Emma Dunn as Mirandy Baines
 Willie Best as Hipp
 Fern Emmett as Clara Potts
 Lee 'Lasses' White as Ed Potts
 Kate Harrington as Gertrude Brown
 Joseph Crehan as Keith
 Edward Earle as Crane
 Bradley Page as McKettrick
 Paul White as Young Hipp
 Earle Hodgins as Jim Barton

Background
The homespun but canny Baines was originally created by popular writer Clarence Budington Kelland in stories for The Saturday Evening Post, and a radio version ran from 1938 through 1950.

External links 
 
 

1941 films
American film series
Films directed by Christy Cabanne
Male characters in literature
Male characters in radio
Radio characters introduced in 1938
Films based on American novels
American comedy-drama films
1941 comedy-drama films
American black-and-white films
RKO Pictures films
1940s American films
1940s English-language films